Vasileia Karachaliou is a Greek laser radial sailor. She won the national championship many times so far. Among all her medals, she has won a gold at the 2017 Sailing World Cup Series Round 1 - Miami and a bronze medal at the 2017 Laser & Laser Radial European Championships Barcelona. In August 2018, she qualified to the 2020 Summer Olympics in Tokyo, Japan. March 23, 2020: she is ranked second in the Laser Radial world rankings.

References

Greek female sailors (sport)
Living people
1996 births
Sailors at the 2020 Summer Olympics – Laser Radial
Olympic sailors of Greece